Nolan Michael Henderson (born June 26, 1998) is an American football quarterback who played for the Delaware Fightin' Blue Hens. After the 2022 season, he declared for the NFL Draft.

Early life
Henderson was born on June 26, 1998, in Smyrna, Delaware. He attended Smyrna High School and was a three-year starter and two-time team captain. In his final two seasons, Henderson led them to an overall record of 24–1 and the school's first two ever state championships, while throwing for 5,614 yards and 68 touchdowns. He was twice named first-team all-state, set several state records, including career passing touchdowns (104), single season passing yards (3,380) and passing touchdowns (36), and in 2016 was given the Maxwell Jim Henry Award for best player in Delaware, as well as Gatorade State Player of the Year and DIFCA Offensive Player of the Year honors. At the annual Delaware High School All-Star game in June 2017, Henderson was named most valuable player after leading the gold team to a 44–0 victory.

In addition to football, Henderson also started four years on the Smyrna High School baseball team as an outfielder, playing under his father who was the head coach.

College career
After visiting several schools in the Colonial Athletic Association (CAA), Henderson announced his commitment to play college football for the Delaware Fightin' Blue Hens. As a true freshman in 2017, Henderson saw no game action, being a redshirt and operating the scout team. The following season, he appeared in a total of three games, making his collegiate debut against Lafayette and seeing the most action against Villanova, where he threw a touchdown pass after coming in for the injured Pat Kehoe. On the season, he completed 12-of-20 passes for 152 yards and one touchdown, in addition to rushing for 36 yards.

Four games into the 2019 season, Henderson was named starter, replacing Kehoe and becoming the first starting quarterback for the Blue Hens from a Delaware school since Sam Postlethwait in 2001. In his first career start, against Penn, he threw for three touchdowns and 260 yards. He finished the season having played in nine games, and recorded 71 pass completions on 126 attempts for 933 yards.

Henderson became a full-time starter in the 2020–21 season, being team captain and throwing for 1,482 yards and 10 touchdowns in eight games. He led them to a 7–1 mark and set the school record with a 70.7 completion percentage, helping them reach the NCAA semifinals. His completion percentage ranked first in the CAA and third in the FCS, and he was named first-team all-conference.

In 2021, Henderson started the first four games before suffering a season-ending abdominal injury. In four games, he went 47-of-80 passing for 646 yards and four touchdowns. He posted his best year as a senior in 2022, setting the single-season school record for passing touchdowns with 32 while completing 285-of-442 passes for 3,216 yards, the latter of which was the third best mark in Delaware history. He was named second-team All-CAA, and led Delaware to the FCS playoffs, where they lost to eventual national champion South Dakota State 42–6, in a game that saw Henderson break his fibula on the first drive.

Although Henderson had one year of eligibility remaining coming into 2023, he opted to declare for the NFL Draft. He finished his college career second all-time in Delaware history for touchdown passes (56), and completed 550-of-850 pass attempts for 6,429 yards. Additionally, he ran for 418 yards, scoring eight times.

Statistics

Personal life 
Henderson grew up a Delaware fan and his childhood dream was to play for the school; his family held season tickets for several years.

References

External links
 

1998 births
Living people
American football quarterbacks
People from Smyrna, Delaware
Players of American football from Delaware
Delaware Fightin' Blue Hens football players